Janet Routledge is a Canadian politician, who was elected to the Legislative Assembly of British Columbia in the 2017 provincial election. She represents the electoral district of Burnaby North as a member of the British Columbia New Democratic Party caucus.

Electoral record

References

External links 

 Assembly page
 Facebook
 Twitter

British Columbia New Democratic Party MLAs
Canadian trade unionists
Living people
Women MLAs in British Columbia
People from Burnaby
21st-century Canadian politicians
21st-century Canadian women politicians
Year of birth missing (living people)